Letizia Ortiz Rocasolano has been the Queen of Spain since the accession of her husband, King Felipe VI, in 2014. She has received numerous titles, decorations, and honorary appointments as Princess of Asturias and as Queen of Spain.

Styles and titles
15 September 197222 May 2004: Ms. Letizia Ortiz Rocasolano
22 May 200419 June 2014: Her Royal Highness The Princess of Asturias
19 June 2014present: Her Majesty The Queen of Spain

Honours

Spanish honours
 
 Dame Grand Cross of the Order of Charles III
 10th De facto Grand Mistress of the Order of Queen Maria Luisa
 Dame of the Decoration of the Royal Cavalry of Seville

Foreign honours
 : 
 Recipient of the Order of Agostinho Neto (7 February 2023)
 
 Grand Cross of the Order of the Liberator General San Martin
 
 Grand Cross of the Order of Merit
 
 Extraordinary Grand Cross of the Order of Boyaca
 
 Member 1st Class of the Order of the Cross of Terra Mariana
 
 Grand Cross of the Order of National Merit
 :
 Grand Cross Special Class of the Order of Merit of the Federal Republic of Germany (17 October 2022)
 
 Grand Cross of the Order of Merit of the Republic of Hungary
 
 Grand Cross of the Order of Merit of the Italian Republic (25 October 2021)
 
 Grand Cordon (Paulwonia) of the Order of the Precious Crown
 
 Commander Grand Cross of the Order of the Three Stars
 
 Grand Cordon of the Order of Merit
 
 Grand Cross of the Order of the Crown
 Recipient of the King Willem-Alexander Inauguration Medal
 : 
 Sash of Special Category of the Order of the Aztec Eagle
 : 
Member Special Class of the Order of Muhammad
 
 Grand Cross of the Order of Vasco Núñez de Balboa
 
 Grand Cross of the Order of the Sun
 Grand Cross of the Order of Merit for Distinguished Service
 
 Grand Cross of the Order of the Golden Heart
 
 Grand Cross of the Order of Christ
 Grand Cross of the Order of Liberty
 
 Grand Cross of the Order of Faithful Service
 :
 Grand Gwanghwa Medal of the Order of Diplomatic Service Merit (15 June 2021)
 :
 Member of the Royal Order of the Seraphim (24 November 2021)

Honorific eponyms

Elche, Alicante: Colegio de Educación Infantil y Primaria Princesa de Asturias (Infantile and Primary Education Public School Princess of Asturias)
Santander: Centro de Acogida Princesa Letizia (Reception Center Princess Letizia)

Other honours

 Asociación Española contra el Cáncer y de su Fundación Científica (Spanish Association Against Cancer and of its Scientific Foundation):  Honorary President
 "Larra" Award for the most distinguished young journalist of the year, Madrid Press Association (2000)
 Hija Adoptiva de Ribadesella (Adoptive Daughter of Ribadesella), Asturias (2004) 
 Hija Predilecta de Oviedo (Favourite Daughter of Oviedo), Asturias (2007)

See also
 List of titles and honours of Felipe VI of Spain
 List of titles and honours of Juan Carlos I of Spain
 List of titles and honours of Queen Sofía of Spain
 List of honours of the Spanish Royal Family by country
 List of titles and honours of the Spanish Crown

Notes and references
   H.R.H. the Princess of Asturias, Official site of the Royal Household of Spain.

Lists of titles by person of Spain
Spanish monarchy
Lists of Spanish monarchs

Grand Cordons of the Order of Merit (Lebanon)
Grand Crosses of the Order of Christ (Portugal)
Grand Crosses of the Order of the Golden Heart
Grand Crosses of the Order of the Liberator General San Martin
Grand Crosses of the Order of Merit of the Republic of Hungary (civil)
Grand Crosses of the Order of the Sun of Peru
Recipients of the Order of the Cross of Terra Mariana, 1st Class
Grand Crosses of the Order of the Crown (Netherlands)
Grand Cordons of the Order of the Precious Crown